The Canadian Kennel Club (or CKC), founded in 1888 and chartered under the Animal Purebred Act, is one of the national kennel clubs of Canada. It maintains breed registries services for those purebred dogs approved for its control by Agriculture and Agri-Food Canada, and provides governance for all CKC-approved dog conformation shows, dog trials and canine events. The CKC is a non-member partner with the Fédération Cynologique Internationale.

See also
List of kennel clubs

References

External links
 

Kennel clubs
Animal charities based in Canada